Kapra is a neighbourhood of Hyderabad city. It falls under Medchal-Malkajgiri district of the Indian state of Telangana and serves as the mandal headquarters of Kapra mandal in Keesara revenue division. It is administered as Circle No. 1 of Greater Hyderabad Municipal Corporation. There are six wards under this circle i.e., Kapra (1), Dr AS Rao Nagar (2), Cherlapally (3), Meerpet HB Colony (4), Mallapur (5) and Nacharam (6).

Geography 

Revenue villages 
Kapra mandal has three Revenue villages which are:-
Cherlapally
Jawaharnagar
 Kapra

References 

Cities and towns in Medchal–Malkajgiri district
Neighbourhoods in Hyderabad, India
Greater Hyderabad Municipal Corporation
Municipal wards of Hyderabad, India